Eduard "Eddy" Christiani (21 April 1918 – 24 October 2016) was a Dutch guitarist, singer, and composer. He was best known for songs like Zonnig Madeira (1938), Ouwe Taaie (1943), Op De Woelige Baren (1948), Kleine Greetje Uit De Polder (1950), Spring Maar Achterop (1952), Daar Bij De Waterkant and Rosemarie Polka (1953). In 1961 he reached the 82nd position with his Spanish-language song Sucu Sucu (1961)

He reminisced about his tricky experiences in the Netherlands of both performing for the occupying Nazis and as a resistance supporter in the TV documentary series The World at War (Episode: Occupation: Holland 1940–1944).

In 2008, his song "Rhythm for You" was included in the video game Fallout 3.

References

1918 births
2016 deaths
Dutch guitarists
20th-century Dutch male singers
Dutch folk singers
Dutch male guitarists
Dutch jazz guitarists
Musicians from The Hague
Male jazz musicians